Todiramphus is a genus of kingfishers in the subfamily Halcyoninae that are endemic to the Philippines, New Guinea, Australia, New Zealand and many islands in the South Pacific.

Taxonomy
The genus was introduced by the French surgeon and naturalist René Lesson in 1827. The name is often spelt Todirhamphus (with rh), but Todiramphus is the original valid spelling.  The name literally means "tody-bill"; tody is a relative of the kingfishers with a similar slender long bill, and the Greek  means "beak" or "bill".

In 1945 James Peters in his Check-list of Birds of the World placed these species in an enlarged genus Halcyon. Hilary Fry did the same in his 1992 monograph on kingfishers, but in 2001 Peter Woodall in the Handbook of the Birds of the World chose to place these Pacific flat-billed species in the resurrected genus Todiramphus. This decision was vindicated by a molecular study published in 2006 that found that the enlarged Halcyon was not monophyletic.

There are now around 30 extant species in the genus but the genus formerly contained fewer species. A molecular phylogenetic study published in 2015 found that some of the polytypic species were paraphyletic. To create monophyletic groups, some of the subspecies were promoted to species status. The most extreme case was that of the collared kingfisher (Todiramphus chloris) that was split into six species: the Pacific kingfisher, the Islet kingfisher, the Torresian kingfisher, the collared kingfisher, the Mariana kingfisher and the Melanesian kingfisher. 

The range of the genus extends from the Philippines in the west to French Polynesia in the east, with the greatest diversity in Australasia.

Description
Members of Todiramphus are medium-sized kingfishers with flattened beaks. They are typically blue or blue-green above with pale underparts. They often have a pale collar and stripe over the eye. Many species are commonly found well away from water and feed largely on terrestrial animals such as insects and lizards. The nest is built in a cavity, most often in a tree.

Species
The genus contains 30 species:
 Blue-black kingfisher, Todiramphus nigrocyaneus
 Winchell's kingfisher, Todiramphus winchelli
 Blue-and-white kingfisher, Todiramphus diops
 Lazuli kingfisher, Todiramphus lazuli
 Forest kingfisher, Todiramphus macleayii
 White-mantled kingfisher, Todiramphus albonotatus
 Ultramarine kingfisher, Todiramphus leucopygius
 Vanuatu kingfisher, Todiramphus farquhari
 Sombre kingfisher, Todiramphus funebris
 Collared kingfisher, Todiramphus chloris
 Torresian kingfisher, Todiramphus sordidus – split from T. chloris
 Islet kingfisher, Todiramphus colonus – split from T. chloris
 Mariana kingfisher, Todiramphus albicilla – split from T. chloris
 Melanesian kingfisher, Todiramphus tristrami – split from T. chloris
 Pacific kingfisher, Todiramphus sacer – split from T. chloris
 Talaud kingfisher, Todiramphus enigma
 Guam kingfisher, Todiramphus cinnamominus – extinct in the wild
 Rusty-capped kingfisher, Todiramphus pelewensis – split from T. cinnamominus
 Pohnpei kingfisher, Todiramphus reichenbachii – split from T. cinnamominus
 Beach kingfisher, Todiramphus saurophagus
 Sacred kingfisher, Todiramphus sanctus
 Flat-billed kingfisher, Todiramphus recurvirostris – split from T. sanctus
 Cinnamon-banded kingfisher, Todiramphus australasia
 Chattering kingfisher, Todiramphus tutus
 Mewing kingfisher, Todiramphus ruficollaris – split from T. tutus
 Society kingfisher, Todiramphus veneratus
 † Mangareva kingfisher, Todiramphus gambieri
 Niau kingfisher, Todiramphus gertrudae – split from T. gambieri
 Marquesan kingfisher, Todiramphus godeffroyi
 Red-backed kingfisher, Todiramphus pyrrhopygius

References

 
Taxa named by René Lesson